Torrey is a unisex given name, also used as a surname. Notable people with the name include:

Given name
 Torrey Butler (born 1980), American basketball player
 Torrey C. Brown (1937-2014), American politician
 Torrey Carter (born 1980),  American R&B singer
 Torrey Craig (born 1990), American basketball player
 Torrey Davis (born 1988), American football player
 Torrey DeVitto (born 1984), American actress, musician and former fashion model
 Torrey Folk (born 1973), American rower
 Torrey Johnson (1909-2002), Chicago Baptist
 Torrey Loomis (born 1974), American filmmaker
 Torrey Mitchell (born 1985), Canadian hockey player
 Torrey Mosvold (1910-1995), Norwegian shipowner
 Torrey Salter (born 1988), American singer
 Torrey Smith (born 1989), American football wide receiver
 Torrey E. Wales (born 1820), American politician
 Torrey Ward (1978-2015), American basketball coach
 Torrey Westrom (born 1973), Minnesota senator

Surname
 Brandon Torrey (b. 1983), American football coach and former player
 Charles Cutler Torrey (1863–1956), American ancient historian and archaeologist
 Charles Turner Torrey (1813-1846), American abolitionist
 DeAndre Torrey, (b. 1998), American football player
 E. Fuller Torrey (b. 1937), American psychiatrist and researcher
 Trisha Torrey (b. 1951), American author
 George Burroughs Torrey (1863–1942), American painter
 George Safford Torrey (1891–1977), American botanist and educator
 Gordon H. Torrey (1919-1995), Philatelist of Maryland
 John Torrey (1796–1873), American botanist
 Justin Torrey (b. 1983), American mixed martial artist
 Marjorie Torrey (b. 1899), American illustrator and writer
 Mary N. Torrey (b. 1910), American statistician and quality control expert
 Raymond H. Torrey (1880–1938), American outdoorsman
 Return Torrey, American politician
 R. A. Torrey (1856–1928), American evangelist

See also
Torey, given name and surname
Torre (name)

Unisex given names